Matthew James Terry (born 20 May 1993) is an English singer and songwriter. In 2016, he was crowned as the winner of the thirteenth series of The X Factor. His debut single, "When Christmas Comes Around", which was released on 11 December 2016, peaked at number three on the UK Singles Chart. His debut album, Trouble was released on 24 November 2017 and charted at 29 on the UK Albums Chart.

Career

2016: The X Factor
Terry auditioned for the thirteenth series of The X Factor in 2016, singing a cover of Ben E. King's "Stand by Me", which earned him four yes votes from the judges. 

Terry was placed in the "boys" category and reached the live shows, where he was mentored by Nicole Scherzinger. Following the eliminations of Freddy Parker in week 2 and Ryan Lawrie in week 7, Terry became Scherzinger's last act left in the competition. 
In the semi-final, he ended up in the bottom two and faced the sing-off against Emily Middlemas. Scherzinger, Louis Walsh and Sharon Osbourne voted to send him through to the final.

On 11 December 2016, he was crowned as the winner of The X Factor 2016, over Saara Aalto, making him the second winner, after James Arthur, to be in the bottom two at any given stage of the competition. He immediately released his winner's single, "When Christmas Comes Around", an original song written by Ed Sheeran. It is the second time that the winner has released an original winner's song, the first being the second series winner Shayne Ward, who released his debut single "That's My Goal". Following his win, Terry signed with Syco and RCA Records.

2017: Trouble
In 2017, Terry featured in a new version of "Súbeme la Radio", with Enrique Iglesias and Sean Paul. The single peaked at number 10 on the UK Singles Chart, and sold 200,000 certified units, scoring a Silver BPI certification.

Following that, he released the first single from his debut album, "Sucker For You". The single peaked at 51 on the UK Singles Chart. A second single, a ballad called "The Thing About Love" was released afterwards. He performed the single on The X Factor as a guest performer. After the performance, he confirmed that the album would be released on 24 November 2017. The single peaked at 51 on the UK Singles Chart. Upon release, Terry's album peaked at 29 on the UK Albums Chart. His album is the lowest charting debut album from any The X Factor winner.

2018–present: Leaving RCA and Madagascar 
In June 2018, Terry was dropped by RCA Records. The next month, he made his acting debut in the UK production of Madagascar – The Musical. In 2019, he returned to the Madagascar musical, portraying the role of Alex the Lion.

Discography

 Trouble (2017)

Tours
 The X Factor Live Tour (2017)

Stage 
 Madagascar – The Musical (2018–2019)
 How The Grinch Stole Christmas - The Musical (2019)

References

English male singers
Living people
People from Bromley
RCA Records artists
The X Factor (British TV series) winners
21st-century English singers
21st-century British male singers
1993 births